Capneidae is a family of cnidarians belonging to the order Actiniaria.

Genera:
 Actinoporus Duchassaing, 1850
 Aureliania Gosse, 1860
 Capnea Forbes, 1841

References

 
Actinioidea
Cnidarian families